Sir Edward Turner, 2nd Baronet (28 April 1719 – 31 October 1766) was one of the Turner baronets of Ambrosden and a Member of Parliament.

Life
Turner was the son of Sir Edward Turner, 1st Baronet and his wife Mary. He received his early education at Bicester Grammar School. He went on to Balliol College, Oxford where he was noted for his "distinguished scholarship and the regularity of his behaviour". He married Cassandra Leigh, niece of the Master of Balliol. He became 2nd Baronet on the death of his father in 1735. Turner died in 1766 and was succeeded in the baronetcy by his son Sir Gregory Page-Turner, 3rd Baronet.

Estates
In about 1740 Turner replaced Ambrosden manor house with a large square country house of eleven bays. His architect was Sanderson Miller, who also designed ornamental buildings in the grounds. A landscaped park  in circumference was laid out around the house. The park was ornamented with lakes and statues, and the drive to the house was along a semicircular avenue of trees.

Turner's new house became a meeting-place for politicians and cultivated society. Cassandra's uncle Dr. Leigh and other wits and learned men from the University of Oxford were frequent visitors.

In 1741 Turner built a new road between Ambrosden and Merton, Oxfordshire. He intended to continue it to Oxford but the remainder of the project was never executed. The road was reputed to cost a guinea a yard. It runs across level ground but its course undulates at regular intervals, apparently intended to help draught animals pull vehicles.

In 1740 Sir James Harington, 6th Baronet, who had accrued large debts by gambling, mortgaged his estate at Merton to Turner. Harington was a Jacobite and in 1747 fled into exile to join Charles Edward Stuart. In 1749 Turner foreclosed the mortgage and thereby obtained the manor of Merton. As Turner had just had a great house built for himself at Ambrosden, Turner had no need of the 16th century manor house at Merton, so he had one wing demolished and the other turned into a farmhouse.

Political career
Turner was elected MP for Great Bedwyn in Wiltshire in the 1741 General Election but was not re-elected in the 1747 General Election.

In the 1754 General Election Turner stood as one of the two Whig candidates for Oxfordshire. Both they and their Tory opponents for the Oxfordshire Election 1754 spent great sums of money on their campaigns, including providing lavish hospitality for electors to try to win their votes. Both parties' candidates were supported by local aristocrats. Turner and his running-mate, Viscount Parker were supported by the Duke of Marlborough, Earl Harcourt and Parker's father the Earl of Macclesfield.

The two Tory candidates won more votes but the returning officer made a "double return": declaring both pairs of candidates to be elected, leaving the House of Commons to make the decision. Both sides petitioned against the election of their opponents and the Commons examined the legitimacy of many of the individual votes. However, most MPs voted on partisan lines rather than on the merits of the case. The Whigs held a majority in the House of Commons, and therefore the two Whig candidates were declared elected.

Turner did not defend the Oxfordshire seat in the 1761 General Election. Instead he successfully stood for Penryn in Cornwall. In 1764, he purchased the manor of Wendlebury, Oxfordshire from the trustees of the 3rd Earl of Abingdon. Sir Edward died in 1766 while still an MP.

References

Sources

1719 births
1766 deaths
Turner baronets
British MPs 1741–1747
British MPs 1754–1761
British MPs 1761–1768
Members of the Parliament of Great Britain for Penryn
Members of the Parliament of Great Britain for English constituencies
Whig (British political party) MPs
Members of the Parliament of Great Britain for Great Bedwyn